International Visegrád Day is celebrated on the 15th of February every year. It was initiated by the International Visegrád Fund along with public service media from Visegrád Group countries (Telewizja Polska, Polskie Radio, Česká televize, Český rozhlas, Rozhlas a televízia Slovenska, Médiaszolgáltatás-támogató és Vagyonkezelő Alap). Established by Memorandum of Understanding between public service media form Visegrád Group countries signed at 18 June 2015.

The day commemorates the anniversary of the meeting of the presidents of Poland, Czechoslovakia and the prime minister of Hungary at Visegrád Castle on 15 February 1991. The aim of establishing the day is to underline historical and social ties binding the people and institutions of Poland, Czech Republic, Slovakia and Hungary and to promote their present cooperation. Public service media of Visegrád Group countries celebrate this day by broadcasting content that supports cooperation between these four states and underlines common issues and problems.

The first Visegrád Day was celebrated on 15 February 2016, on 25th anniversary of meeting of the presidents of Poland, Czechoslovakia and the prime minister of Hungary in 1991.

References

February observances